Rafik Bouderbal (born 19 September 1987) is a French professional footballer who plays as a winger for  club Sète.

Club career
Bouderbal was born in Lyon. On 20 January 2009, Bouderbal signed a two and a half year professional contract with Lorient.

ES Sétif
On 30 September 2009, Bouderbal was loaned out to Algerian club ES Sétif until the end of the season. On 6 November 2009, he made his league debut for ES Sétif in a league game against USM El Harrach, coming as a substitute in the 55th minute. On 25 December 2009, he scored his first goal for the club in a cup game against US Doucen. Bouderbal made a total of 8 league appearances, scoring 1 goal, during his loan period with the club.

Lyon-Duchère (Sporting Club Lyon)
Bouderbal moved to AS Lyon-Duchère in 2011, the first of three spells at the club encompassing five seasons (2011–13, 2015–16 and 2019–20, when the team had rebranded as Sporting Club Lyon).. He made 81 league appearances for the club in total.

Beauvais and Bourg-en-Bresse
Bouderbal's first spell with Lyon-Duchère ended in January 2013, when he left the club to sign for fellow Championnat de France Amateur club AS Beauvais Oise. At the end of the season he moved to FC Bourg-Péronnas, who were reprieved from relegation, giving him another opportunity to play in Championnat National.

RC Arbaâ
Bouderbal spent a second spell in Algeria, with RC Arbaâ, in 2014–15, but left early due to a financial dispute, returning to France after negotiations to join MC Alger broke down. Back in France, he returned to Lyon-Duchère.

USM Alger
Bouderbal joined USM Alger in the summer of 2016, at the end of his second Lyon-Duchère spell. By February 2017 he was allowed to leave due to family problems. He returned to the club in December 2017. He finally ended his time with USM Alger in June 2019, returning to Lyon-Duchère.

FC Sète 34
In July 2020, Bouderbal signed for FC Sète 34, newly promoted to Championnat National.

Personal life
Born in France, Bouderbal's family is originally from the Bab Ezzouar district of Algiers.

Honours

Club
USM Alger
 Algerian Ligue Professionnelle 1: 2018–19
 Algerian Super Cup: 2016

References

External links

 
 
 

1987 births
Living people
Footballers from Lyon
Association football midfielders
Association football forwards
French footballers
Algerian footballers
French sportspeople of Algerian descent
AS Saint-Priest players
FC Lorient players
ES Sétif players
Lyon La Duchère players
AS Beauvais Oise players
Football Bourg-en-Bresse Péronnas 01 players
RC Arbaâ players
USM Alger players
FC Sète 34 players
Championnat National players
Championnat National 2 players
Algerian Ligue Professionnelle 1 players